WMMA-FM (93.9 MHz) is a radio station in Nekoosa, Wisconsin. It is part of the Relevant Radio Christian network.

External links
WMMA-FM’s official website

MMA-FM
MMA-FM
Catholic radio stations
Radio stations established in 1999
Relevant Radio stations
1999 establishments in Wisconsin